The Visionary Heads is a series of black chalk and pencil drawings produced by William Blake after 1818 by request of John Varley, the watercolour artist and astrologer. The subjects of the sketches, many of whom are famous historical and mythical characters, appeared to Blake in visions during late night meetings with Varley, as if sitting for portraits.  The drawings are contained in three sketchbooks and there are a number of loose leaves indicating the existence of a fourth sketchbook. Like most of Blake's other works, they have been subject to academic scrutiny and study.

Among the Visionary Heads drawn by Blake are David, Solomon, Uriah and Bathsheba, Nebuchadnezzar, Saul, Lot, Job, Socrates, his wife Xantippe, Julius Caesar, Christ, Muhammad, Merlin, Boadicea, Charlemagne, Ossian, Robin Hood, Caractacus, King Edward I, his Queen Eleanor, Black Prince, King Edward III, William Wallace, Wat Tyler, Roger Bacon, John Milton, Voltaire, as well as Devil, Satan, "Cancer", The Man Who Built the Pyramids, The Portrait of a Man who instructed Mr Blake in Painting &c in his Dreams, etc. The most famous of that series is Blake's painting of The Ghost of a Flea, made after the Visionary Head of The Ghost of a Flea.

Background and context

William Blake said he had seen visions from his young age throughout his life, and in these visions he was visited by many spirits of people from the remote past as well as by his deceased friends from whom he received his inspiration for his poetry and painting. He also believed he was personally instructed and encouraged by archangels to create his artistic works, which he said were actively read and enjoyed by the same archangels. In 1800 he wrote: “I know that our deceased friends are more really with us than when they were apparent to our mortal part. Thirteen years ago I lost a brother, and with his spirit I converse daily and hourly in the spirit, and see him in my remembrance, in the region of my imagination. I hear his advice, and even now write from his dictate.” 

In September 1818 the successful young painter John Linnell, one of the best friends and kindest patrons of Blake, introduced to Blake his former teacher John Varley. Varley was fascinated by Blake's accounts of his visions, thinking that they came from the spirit world of astrology. He persuaded Blake to draw the images of these visions in his presence to illustrate his Treatise on Zodiacal Physiognomy, published in 1828, after the death of Blake.

In 1819–20, Blake and Varley would often meet at Varley's house, and from about 9.00 pm until 5.00 am, play a game in which Varley would suggest Blake attempt to summon the spirit of some historical or mythological person. On the appearance of the spirit, Blake would then attempt to sketch its likeness. These drawings of which many remain, are the "spiritual images" of many very well known people of the past, whom Blake said he saw in visions that he experienced during these sessions.

Blake's biographer Alexander Gilchrist describes the meetings in the following manner:  
 
 
Sometimes these sessions were in the nature of public events, as Bentley noted:  "These midnight seances attracted the attention of many who otherwise would have ignored Blake, and a surprising number of lurid accounts were published about them – accounts which may, however, be substantially true. At least they are fairly consistent both with each other and with the inscriptions on the Visionary Heads themselves."

John Varley left his account of these sessions that took place almost nightly, recording some dates and circumstances of the evenings. He made a lot of detailed inscriptions below or on the back of Blake's drawings that help to classify them.  He also created two lists known as “Varley's lists of Visionary Heads” (A & B) where he specified about 90 titles (some of them repeated) of  “Portraits Drawn by W. Blake from Visions which appeared to him & Remained while he completed them…”  John Linnell, who also was involved in these events and copied many of Blake's Visionary Heads to engrave them later for Varley's Treatise, wrote his own account and views on this subject in his “Journal” and “Autobiography” (fully cited by Gerald Eades Bentley Jr. in his Blake Records, see in the Bibliography below). In the opinion of the Blake scholar Sir Geoffrey Keynes: 

Another Blake scholar, Kathleen Raine, expressed her opinion thus:

Description

Varley provided Blake with a number of sketchbooks of different sizes for the purpose of making the drawings, the so-called "Blake–Varley Sketchbooks" (BVS).  Collectively, scholars have identified three sketchbooks in which the drawings were contained. Two have been recovered by collectors, and the third has yet to be discovered, though clear records from the period and individual pages attest to the sketchbook. Other unbound sketches have been identified as well, some of them removed from one of the sketchbooks, while others may have been loose since Blake's production of them.

In addition, there are many Loose Visionary Heads made of separate sheets of paper. Some of them survived only in copies made by John Linnell. Though many other pictures were documented by Varley and Linnell, they have not been discovered and possibly are lost forever. Among these lost are the visionary heads of King Alfred, Cleopatra, St. Dunstan, Edward IV; Eleanor (Queen of Edward I),  Guy Fawkes, Henry I of England, Henry II of England, Hezekiah, Macbeth, Lady Macbeth, Founder of the Pyramids, Richard III, David Rizzio, Richard Duke of Normandy, Robert, Duke of Normandy, King Rufus, Semiramis, William Shakespeare and Wild Thyme.

The "Blake–Varley Sketchbooks":

The Small Blake–Varley Sketchbook (discovered in 1967)
The Large Blake–Varley Sketchbook (discovered in 1989)
The Folio Blake–Varley Sketchbook (not yet discovered)

The Small Blake–Varley Sketchbook

The sketchbook (c. 1819, Butlin #692, now broken up) that was lost to sight for almost a century was acquired in 1967 by Mr D. E. Clayton-Smith and then described and reproduced in 1969 by Martin Butlin (see Bibliography). This is an album 155 × 105 mm with the watermark 1806 that contains at least 36 pictures attributed to Blake, including:

Empress Maud 
Caractacus (Butlin #719)  
Falconberg 
Prince Arthur 
Harold II killed at the Battle of Hastings 
Herod 
Corinna? (in profile) 
Antinous? 
King John of England 
Merlin 
Milton's first wife 
The Devil and a man in armour 
Ghost of a Flea
 The Man Who Built Pyramids (#752) 
Voltaire in profile 
Edward VI? with a spiky collar 
Lais of Corinth the Courtesian 
Richard Coeur de Lion 
Cancer (#751)

plus a few unidentified figures.

The Large Blake–Varley Sketchbook

The Sketchbook was sold by Christie's (London) to Mr. Allan Parker. All designs were reproduced in Christie's catalogue 21 March 1989. This is an album 254 × 203 mm with the watermark: C. BRENCHLEY 1804. The leaves were foliated 1–89? and later 22 leaves were razored out and then some of them replaced; this is why the suggested numeration is quite sophisticated. The album contains more than 60 of Blake's pictures including:

Canute Dark Hair & Eyes (Butlin #721) cut out 
Solomon   (#702) cut out Cassibelane The British Chief   (#716) cut out 
Boadicea    (#717) cut out 
Merlin (cut out) [called A Welsh Bard, Job or Moses?]
Queen Eleanor of Henry II of England and mother of Richard I    (#727) cut out 
Owen Glendower    (#743–744) cut out 
King John of England    (#731) cut out 
Henry Percy (Hotspur)     (#745) cut out 
Wat Tyler by Wm Blake, from his spectre   (#737) cut out 
Tax gatherer killed by Wat Tyler    (#742) cut out 
The Empress Maud, mother of Henry II of England     (#725) cut out 
Wat Tyler's daughter    (#741) cut out 
Faulconberg the Bastard    (#730) cut out 
Alexander the Great
Henry V of England
The Black Prince
Robin Hood
Pharaoh who knew Joseph (son of Jacob)
Joseph's Mistress (Potiphar's wife)
Perkin Warbeck
Vortigern
Rowena
John Felton the assassinator of the Duke Buckingham
John Milton when a Boy
John Milton when Young
Charlemagne
John Milton's Youngest Daughter
John Milton's Eldest Daughter
Bertrand de Gurdon who wounded Richard Coeur de Lion with an arrow
 The Captain to Richard I who Flayd Bertrand de Gurdon alive
Jack Sheppard under the Gallows
Colonel Blood who attempted to steal the Crown
The Great Earl of Warwick Brother to Edward IV
 Isabella of France wife of Edward II and mother of Edward III
Robert Bruce King of Scotland
Geoffrey of Monmouth
Ossian
Cornelius Agrippa
Miss Blandy who poisoned her Father, Mother Brownrigg, Eloise, Countess of Essex who poisoned Overbury, and Pope Joan
Catherine Hayes Burnt for the Murder of her Husband
Thomas a Becket Preaching
Mary Queen of Scots
James Hepburn, 4th Earl of Bothwell
Tom Nixon the Idiot author of the Prophecies
Pisistratus
 a Daughter of William Shakespeare
Xantippa wife of Socrates
Olimpia, probably mother of Alexander the Great
William Shakespeare's Wife 
Richard Savage the Poet
Sir Robert Lucy, William Shakespeare's prosecutor

The Folio Blake–Varley Sketchbook
The folio size Blake-Varley Sketchbook has not been discovered in whole. However, three loose pages with the visionary heads of Pindar, Corinna  and Lais are extant. The available images are from a 42 × 27 cm album with the watermark: W TURNER & SON.
 

Loose Visionary Heads

There are more than 50 loose visionary heads including:

 Satan with a plumed helmet  (Butlin #693) 
 Satan as a fiend at Blake's grated window  (#694)  
 Lot  (#695)  
 The Egyptian Task master who was killed & Buried by Moses and Saul King of Israel under the influence of the Evil Spirit  (#696)  
 Saul  (#697)  
 David  (#698)  
 Uriah and Bathsheba  (#699)  
 Solomon  (#700)  
 Job  (#703) 
 Nebuchadnezzar Coin as Seen in a Vision by Mr. Blake  (#704) 
 Head of Achilles  (#707) 
 Lais and a foot and ankle  (#712) 
 Socrates  (#713 & #714) 
  A young faun  (#715) 
 Boadicea?  (#718) 
 Caractacus, counterproof   (#719) 
 Muhammad  (#720) 
 Canute,  counterproof   (#723)  
 Queen Eleanor of Aquitaine, wife of Henry II of England and mother of Richard I  (#726) 
 The Assassin lying dead at the feet of Ed. I & Saladin.  (#728) 
 Richard Coeur de Lion   (#729)   
 William Wallace and Edward I   (#734) 
 King Edward I   (#735) 
 King Edward III   (#735, 736) 
 Gray the Poet and Friar Bacon   (#746)  
 Henry VIII of England? as a youth   (#747) 
 Old Tom Parr when Young   (#748) 
 The spirit of Voltaire by Blake   (#749)
 The Ghost of a Flea, tempera   (#750)
 The Man who built the Pyramids drawn by Willam Blake, Oct. 18, 1819.    (#752)
 The Man Who Taught Blake Painting in his Dreams   (#753)
 Imagination  of A man who Mr Blake has recd instruct[ion] in Painting &c from, counterproof   (#754)
 The Portrait of a Man who instructed Mr Blake in Painting &c, in his Dreams and  Imagination  of A man who Mr Blake has recd instruct[ion] in Painting &c from, replica (?by Linnell) (#755)
 Visionary Head   (#759)  
 Five Visionary Heads (Heads of Women) 270x324mm   (#765) 

etc.

Some other Visionary Heads (in the order of Martin Butlin Catalogue)

See also
 The Ghost of a FleaNotes

Bibliography
 A Treatise on Zodiacal Physiognomy, illustrated by engravings of heads and features, and accompanied by tables of the time of rising of the twelve signs of the zodiac; and containing also new and astrological explanations of some remarkable portions of ancient mythological history (published for the author, 10, Great Tichfield Street, London 1928; sold by Longman) IV, 60pp.: 6 Plates, (8vo), 25 cm; plates engraved by J. Linnell.
 Bentley, Jr, G. E.. Blake Records. Second Edition. New Haven and London: Yale University Press, 2004. Pp. xxxviii+943. Illus.   (BR2) 
 Bentley, Jr, G. E..  Blake's Visionary Heads: Lost Drawings and a Lost Book,  in Romanticism and Millenarianism, ed. Tim Fulford (New York: Palgrave, 2002): 183–205. 
 Bentley, Jr, G. E.. The Stranger from Paradise: A Biography of William Blake, Yale University Press, New Haven & London, 2003 
 Butlin, Martin (ed., and Introduction and Notes). The Blake-Varley Sketchbook of 1819 in the Collection of M. D. E. Clayton-Stamm. [2 vols.]. London: Heinemann, 1969. .
 Keynes, Sir Geoffry (ed. incl. Introduction and Commentary). Drawings of William Blake: 92 Pencil Studies.  Dover Publications, Inc., New York, 1970 
 Raine, Kathleen. William Blake, The World of Art Library - Artists, Arts Book Society, Thames and Hudson, London, 1970 (216 pp, 156 illustrations) 

Further reading

Visionary Heads in musicVisionary Heads'', five pieces for piano after pictures by William Blake Op. 172 (2013) written by Russian/British composer Dmitri N. Smirnov → YouTube

19th-century portraits
Art by William Blake